Pratap Chauhan (born 21 June 1935) is an Indian former cricketer. He played first-class cricket for Delhi and Southern Punjab between 1958 and 1966.

See also
 List of Delhi cricketers

References

External links
 

1935 births
Living people
Indian cricketers
Delhi cricketers
Southern Punjab cricketers
Cricketers from Delhi